Waimarama Taumaunu  (born 18 October 1962), often known as Wai Taumaunu, is a New Zealand netball coach and former international netball player.

Biography
Taumaunu was born in Waipawa, New Zealand.  She was a member of New Zealand's national netball team, the Silver Ferns, from 1981 to 1991. During that time, she played in the team that won the 1987 Netball World Championships, and was also captain of the team in the last three years of her international career.

In 1998, Taumaunu was appointed as national performance director for All England Netball, and remained in that role until 2003. During that time she was also the assistant coach for the England national team in their 2003 Netball World Championships campaign. In 2007, Taumaunu was the head coach of the Capital Shakers in the National Bank Cup.

In the 1992 New Year Honours, Taumaunu was appointed a Member of the Order of the British Empire, for services to netball. She was inducted into the New Zealand Sports Hall of Fame in 1996. Of Ngāti Porou and Ngāi Tahu descent, she was also inducted into the Māori Sports Hall of Fame in 2007. In May 2008, Taumaunu accepted the position of assistant coach for the Silver Ferns, under head coach Ruth Aitken and in October 2011, took over as head coach for the Silver Ferns.

In the 2016 New Year Honours, Taumaunu was appointed an Officer of the New Zealand Order of Merit for services to netball.

Personal life 
Taumaunu's daughter Tiana Metuarau is also a netball player, and debuted for the Silver Ferns in September 2021.

References 

1962 births
Living people
New Zealand netball players
New Zealand international netball players
New Zealand netball coaches
New Zealand Members of the Order of the British Empire
People from Waipawa
New Zealand Māori netball players
Ngāti Porou people
Ngāi Tahu people
Officers of the New Zealand Order of Merit
Sportspeople from Gisborne, New Zealand
New Zealand national netball team coaches
Netball players at the 1989 World Games
Netball players at the 1985 World Games
1987 World Netball Championships players
1991 World Netball Championships players
1983 World Netball Championships players
Central Pulse coaches
Sportspeople from the Hawke's Bay Region